Pitcairnia atrorubens is a species of flowering plant in Bromeliaceae family. It is native to Costa Rica, Panama, Honduras, Guatemala, Colombia, and western Mexico as far north as Nayarit.

References

atrorubens
Flora of Central America
Flora of Mexico
Flora of Colombia
Plants described in 1856
Taxa named by John Gilbert Baker